The Professional Numismatists Guild is a non-profit organization dedicated to coin collecting, as well as the buying and selling on coins and paper money.

History
Founded in 1955, the organization is composed of many of the top coin and paper money dealers in the United States.

References

External links

Numismatic associations
1955 establishments in the United States
Organizations established in 1955